General Sir Cyril Norman MacMullen, KCB, CMG, CIE, DSO (13 December 1877 – 12 November 1944) was a British officer in the British Indian Army.

Early life
MacMullen was born in Delhi to Col. Frederic Wood MacMullen and Mary Eleanora Ward.

Military career
MacMullen was commissioned a second-lieutenant on the unattached list of the Indian Army on 4 August 1897, and served on the North West Frontier in 1897. Promoted to lieutenant on 4 November 1899, he was with the 15th Bengal Infantry in 1900, and then with the Tibet Expedition in 1903. He saw action in World War I as a General Staff Officer Grade 1 with the 2nd Mounted Division during the Gallipoli Campaign and then as Brigadier-General on the General Staff with XV Corps in France.

MacMullen served in the Third Anglo-Afghan War and then became Commander of the Bareilly Brigade in November 1919. He went on to be Deputy Quartermaster-General in India in 1924, General Officer Commanding Rawalpindi District and 2nd Indian Division in March 1927 and Adjutant-General, India in May 1930. He then became General Officer Commanding-in-Chief Eastern Command in April 1932 before retiring in April 1936.

Personal life
In 1905, he married Maud MacIver-Campbell, daughter of Col. Aylmer MacIver-Campbell. They had two daughters, Pamela and Margaret.

He died in a nursing home in Dublin in 1944.

References

|-

Sources

1877 births
1944 deaths
British Indian Army generals
Knights Commander of the Order of the Bath
Companions of the Order of St Michael and St George
Companions of the Order of the Star of India
Companions of the Distinguished Service Order
Indian Army generals of World War I
Military personnel of British India
British people in colonial India